Albin or Alpin is the 14th bishop of Lyon who succeeded Saint Just. He is recognized as a Saint by both the Roman Catholic Church. and the Eastern Orthodox Church and is celebrated on 15 September.

Biography 
It seems that the name was originally Alpin, quickly softened to Albin by Bede and the martyrologies which succeed him. According to them, Albin succeeds Justus in 390 and was a holy bishop. Tradition assigns him the foundation of the St. Stephen's Church, where he was buried. He died shortly before 400AD.

References 

390s deaths
Bishops of Lyon
4th-century bishops in Gaul
Year of birth unknown